Maple Ridge, Ontario, may refer to:

Maple Ridge, Muskoka Municipal District, Ontario
Maple Ridge, Stormont, Dundas and Glengarry United Counties, Ontario